"How Do I Deal" is a song by American actress Jennifer Love Hewitt from the soundtrack to the film I Still Know What You Did Last Summer. The song was released as a single on November 17, 1998, with an accompanying music video. The single became Hewitt's one and only appearance on the US Billboard Hot 100 singles chart, peaking at number 59 in a seven-week run. Although not a big success in America, the single reached number five in New Zealand and peaked at number eight in Australia, where it is certified gold.

Track listings
US CD, 7-inch, and cassette single
 "How Do I Deal" (single version) – 3:23
 "Try to Say Goodbye" (performed by Jory Eve) – 3:36

European CD single
 "How Do I Deal" – 3:24
 "Sugar Is Sweeter" (performed by CJ Bolland) – 5:34

Australian CD single
 "How Do I Deal" – 3:23
 "Sugar Is Sweeter" (Danny Saber Remix featuring Justin Warfield, performed by CJ Bolland) – 4:57
 "Try to Say Goodbye" (performed by Jory Eve) – 3:35

Charts

Weekly charts

Year-end charts

Certifications

Release history

References

143 Records singles
1998 songs
1999 singles
Jennifer Love Hewitt songs
I Know What You Did Last Summer (franchise)
Music videos directed by Joseph Kahn
Song recordings produced by Bruce Fairbairn
Song recordings produced by David Foster
Songs written for films
Warner Records singles